Kallu is a 1988 Indian Telugu-Language ethnographic drama film based on the lives of five blind people directed by M. V. Raghu, based on Gollapudi Maruti Rao's play with the same name. In 2018, the film celebrated its 30th Anniversary by "Mukhi Media" in Hyderabad.

The film won four state Nandi Awards, and the Filmfare Award for Best Direction. It was screened in Indian panorama section of the International Film Festival of India, and the Hyderabad Film Festival. The film won thirty awards including special mention from the  CBFC Jury.

Cast
Sivaji Raja
Chidambaram
Gundu Hanumantha Rao
N. J Bhikshu
Rajeswari
SP Balasubramanyam (cameo)
Bhaskar Rao
Sripada Somayajulu

Awards
Nandi Awards - 1988
 Third Best Feature Film - Bronze -  D. Vijaya Kumar & A. L. Ananda Rao 
 Best First Film of a Director - M. V. Raghu
 Best Story Writer - Gollapudi Maruthi Rao
 Special Jury Award - Kallu Chidambaram

Filmfare Awards South
Filmfare Award for Best Director – Telugu - M. V. Raghu

References

1988 films
Disability in fiction
1980s Telugu-language films
Films about social issues in India
Indian avant-garde and experimental films
Films about labour
Films scored by S. P. Balasubrahmanyam
Indian nonlinear narrative films
Films about disability in India
Telugu-language literature
Fictional characters with disabilities
Social realism in film
Films about poverty in India
Indian drama films
Films about blind people in India